Alyssa Cole (born August 12, 1982) is an American author of historical, science fiction, and contemporary romance novels. Her stories include diverse casts of characters with a variety of professions, from Civil War spies to modern day epidemiologists. Her romance works explore both straight and gay relationships.

Career 
Alyssa Cole began her writing career by publishing collections of short stories and novellas. Her stories tend to take place during important events in American history, including the civil rights movement, the Revolutionary War, and the Harlem Renaissance.

Cole's Loyal League novels, a trilogy taking place with the backdrop of the American Civil War, is represented by Kensington Publishing Corporation. Her Reluctant Royals novels, a contemporary romance series inspired by modern-day royalty, is represented by Avon Romance.

Alyssa Cole has collaborated with other authors on anthologies. These authors include Rose Learner, Courtney Milan, 
Lena Hart, Kianna Alexander, Piper Huguley, and Kate McMurray. At times, Cole has taken part in the month-long challenge of National Novel Writing Month (NaNoWriMo) to encourage her writing habits and finish longer works.

Cole's An Extraordinary Union, published in 2017, won multiple awards, and her book A Princess in Theory was named one of The New York Times most notable books of 2018. Her 2020 thriller novel When No One Is Watching garnered acclaim from critics.

Cole is a prominent figure in the effort to increase the representation of black authors in the romance publishing industry. Her discussion for the need for diversity in the genre has occurred in convention panels and on Twitter.

In late December 2019, Romance Writers of America (RWA) suspended Courtney Milan, chair of the ethics committee, after other romance authors filed complaints with the RWA because she highlighted racist tropes in those authors' books on social media. With Milan's permission, Alyssa Cole made documents related to the dispute public on Twitter.

Themes 
Cole's writing often contains political and activist elements. One of her historical novel series takes place during the Civil War and contains heroines and heroes who are involved in important political events in American history. Another historical series, set in the American 1960s, sees Cole's characters in the middle of the civil rights movement. Her contemporary novel, A Princess in Theory, contains a hero who is a prince of a small, fictional African country that deals with advances and issues modeled after real life nations of similar size and geography.

Personal life 
Cole was born in the Bronx, and spent her childhood there and in Jersey City. 

Cole mainly resides in the Caribbean island of Martinique, but also spends a portion of her time in New York City.

During the process of writing a character with ADHD, Cole discovered she also lived with the same diagnosis.

Bibliography

Awards 
 2019 - An Unconditional Freedom - The Ripped Bodice Awards for Excellence in Romance Fiction
2019 - Once Ghosted Twice Shy - The Ripped Bodice Awards for Excellence in Romance Fiction
2019 - A Prince on Paper - The Ripped Bodice Awards for Excellence in Romance Fiction
2018 - An Extraordinary Union - American Library Association RUSA Best Romance
2017 - An Extraordinary Union - Vulture's 10 Best Romance Books of 2017
2017 - An Extraordinary Union - Booklist Top 10 Romances 2017
2017 - An Extraordinary Union - Publishers Weekly Best Books of 2017, Romance
2021 –  When No One Is Watching – Edgar Award for Best Paperback Original.

References 

1982 births
Living people
Cole Alyssa
Women romantic fiction writers
21st-century American women writers
21st-century American novelists
American women novelists
African-American women writers
20th-century African-American people
20th-century African-American women